The Men's Irish Junior Cup is a knockout trophy played for field hockey clubs in Ireland. Entry is open to sides that do not qualify for the Irish Senior Cup and to the second teams of clubs that play in the Irish Senior Cup. The trophy was first played for in 1895, a year after the Senior version of the trophy.

Historical format

From its start in 1895 until the 1980s, the tournament was played in regional tournaments. The winners of the regional tournaments in Leinster, Munster, Ulster and at times Connacht would proceed through to semi-final matches. The finals were played in one weekend until 1935. The final was then moved to a separate weekend. The change was prompted by the circumstances of the 1934 finals. Castlecomer played the semi-final against Cork Harlequins (with extra time) on the Friday afternoon and a semi-final replay (with more extra time) on the Saturday morning. After winning the marathon semi-final, the exhaustion of the Castlecomer team forced them to scratch from the Final that was due to be played on the Saturday afternoon.

Current format

In the 1980s the format of the competition was changed when the last eight teams from the regions entered an open draw. After a few years of operating this system the competition was changed to a completely open draw.

The introduction of the Irish Trophy in 2008-09 meant that entry to the Irish Junior Cup was restricted to club's second teams. A small number of third eleven teams also qualify.

Both teams are allowed a squad of 18 as long as you have two fully kitted goalkeepers and there is no extra time, a drawn match will be finalised with penalty strokes.

The Irish Junior Cup Trophy is the only trophy in Ireland where the Captain's name is engraved as well as the team's name and year.

Finals

(Records are incomplete)

1890s

 1895 Beechfield
 1896 Sandyford
 1897 Avoca
 1898 Three Rock Rovers II
 1899 Dublin University II

1900s

 1900 Corinthians II 2-1 Antrim II
 1901 Dublin University II beat Antrim II
 1902 Dublin University II
 1903 Dublin University II
 1904 Kingston GS
 1905 Naas
 1906 Monkstown II 5–0  Lisnagarvey 
 1907 Dublin University II
 1908 Monkstown II
 1909 Monkstown II 3-0 Whitehead

Notes

1910s

1920s

1930s

1940s

1950s

1960s

1970s

1980s

1990s

2000s

2010s

2020s

Sources

External links
 The Irish Hockey Union Website

!
1895 establishments in Ireland